The clarinet is a single-reed musical instrument in the woodwind family, with a nearly cylindrical bore and a flared bell.

Clarinets comprise a family of instruments of differing sizes and pitches. The clarinet family is the largest woodwind family, ranging from the BB♭ contrabass to the E♭ soprano. The B soprano clarinet is the most common type, and is the instrument usually indicated by the word "clarinet".

German instrument maker Johann Christoph Denner is generally credited with inventing the clarinet sometime after 1698 by adding a register key to the chalumeau, an earlier single-reed instrument. Over time, additional keywork and airtight pads were added to improve the tone and playability. Today the clarinet is a standard fixture of the orchestra and concert band and is used in classical music, military bands, klezmer, jazz, and other styles.

Etymology
The word clarinet may have entered the English language via the French clarinette (the feminine diminutive of Old French clarin), or from Provençal clarin ("oboe"), originating from the Latin root clarus ("clear"). The word is related to Middle English clarion, a type of trumpet, the name of which derives from the same root.

The earliest mention of the word clarinette being used for the instrument dates to a 1710 order placed by the Duke of Gronsfeld for two instruments made by Jacob Denner. The English form clarinet is found as early as 1733, and the now-archaic clarionet appears from 1784 until the early 20th century.

A person who plays the clarinet is called a clarinetist (in North American English), a clarinettist (in British English), or simply a clarinet player.

Characteristics

The clarinet's cylindrical bore is the main reason for its distinctive timbre, which varies between the three main registers (the chalumeau, clarion, and altissimo). The A and B clarinets have nearly the same bore and nearly identical tonal quality, although the A typically has a slightly warmer sound. The tone of the E clarinet is brighter and can be heard through loud orchestral textures. The bass clarinet has a characteristically deep, mellow sound, and the alto clarinet sounds similar to the bass, though not as dark.

Range
Clarinets have the largest pitch range of common woodwinds. Nearly all soprano and piccolo clarinets have keywork enabling them to play the E below middle C as their lowest written note. The concert pitch that sounds depends on the individual instrument's transposition (this low E sounds as a concert D3 on a B soprano clarinet, a whole tone lower than the written note). Some B clarinets go to a written E to match the range of the A clarinet. Many bass clarinets have additional keywork to written C. Among the less common members of the clarinet family, contrabass clarinets may have keywork to written D, C, or B; the basset clarinet and basset horn generally go to low C. Defining the top end of a clarinet's range is difficult, since many advanced players can produce notes well above the highest notes commonly found in method books. G is usually the highest note encountered in classical repertoire, but fingerings as high as A exist.

The range of a clarinet can be divided into three distinct registers:
 The low chalumeau register, from the written low E to the written B above middle C (B)  (named after the instrument that was the clarinet's immediate predecessor)
The bridging throat tones, from written G to B, are sometimes treated as a separate register
 The middle clarion register, which spans just over an octave (from a written B above middle C (B) to the C two octaves above middle C (C))
 The high altissimo register, consisting of the notes above the written C two octaves above middle C (C)
The three registers have characteristically different sounds—the chalumeau is rich and dark, the clarion is brighter and sweet, like a trumpet heard from afar, and the altissimo can be piercing and sometimes shrill.

Acoustics

The production of sound by a clarinet follows these steps:

 The mouthpiece and reed are surrounded by the player's lips, which put light, even pressure on the reed and form an airtight seal. Air is blown past the reed and down the instrument. In the same way a flag flaps in the breeze, the air rushing past the reed causes it to vibrate. As air pressure from the mouth increases, the amount the reed vibrates increases until the reed hits the mouthpiece.The reed stays pressed against the mouthpiece until either the springiness of the reed forces it to open or a returning pressure wave 'bumps' into the reed and opens it. Each time the reed opens, a puff of air goes through the gap, after which the reed swings shut again. When played loudly, the reed can spend up to 50% of the time shut. The 'puff of air' or compression wave (at around 3% greater pressure than the surrounding air) travels down the cylindrical tube and escapes at the point where the tube opens out. This is either at the closest open hole or at the end of the tube (see diagram: image 1).
 More than a 'neutral' amount of air escapes from the instrument, which creates a slight vacuum or rarefaction in the clarinet tube. This rarefaction wave travels back up the tube (image 2).
 The rarefaction is reflected off the sloping end wall of the clarinet mouthpiece. The opening between the reed and the mouthpiece makes very little difference to the reflection of the rarefaction wave. This is because the opening is very small compared to the size of the tube, so almost the entire wave is reflected back down the tube even if the reed is completely open at the time the wave hits (image 3).
 When the rarefaction wave reaches the other (open) end of the tube, air rushes in to fill the slight vacuum. A little more than a 'neutral' amount of air enters the tube and causes a compression wave to travel back up the tube (image 4). Once the compression wave reaches the mouthpiece end of the 'tube', it is reflected again back down the pipe. However at this point, either because the compression wave 'bumped' the reed or because of the natural vibration cycle of the reed, the gap opens and another 'puff' of air is sent down the pipe.
 The original compression wave, now greatly reinforced by the second 'puff' of air, sets off on another two trips down the pipe (travelling four pipe lengths in total) before the cycle is repeated again.

In addition to this primary compression wave, other waves, known as harmonics, are created. Harmonics are caused by factors including the imperfect wobbling and shaking of the reed, the reed sealing the mouthpiece opening for part of the wave cycle (which creates a flattened section of the sound wave), and imperfections (bumps and holes) in the bore. A wide variety of compression waves are created, but only some (primarily the odd harmonics) are reinforced. This in combination with the cut-off frequency (where a significant drop in resonance occurs) results in the characteristic tone of the clarinet.

This hourglass shape, although invisible to the naked eye, helps to correct the pitch and responsiveness of the instrument. The diameter of the bore affects the instrument's sound characteristics. The bell at the bottom of the clarinet flares out to improve the tone and tuning of the lowest notes. The fixed reed and fairly uniform diameter of the clarinet result in an acoustical performance approximating that of a cylindrical stopped pipe. Recorders use a tapered internal bore to overblow at the octave when the thumb/register hole is pinched open, while the clarinet, with its cylindrical bore, overblows at the twelfth.

Most modern clarinets have "undercut" tone holes that improve intonation and sound. Undercutting means chamfering the bottom edge of tone holes inside the bore. Acoustically, this makes the tone hole function as if it were larger, but its main function is to allow the air column to follow the curve up through the tone hole (surface tension) instead of "blowing past" it under the increasingly directional frequencies of the upper registers. Covering or uncovering the tone holes varies the length of the pipe, changing the resonant frequencies of the enclosed air column and hence the pitch. The player moves between the chalumeau and clarion registers through use of the register key. The open register key stops the fundamental frequency from being reinforced, making the reed vibrate at three times the frequency, which produces a note a twelfth above the original note.

Most woodwind instruments have a second register that begins an octave above the first (with notes at twice the frequency of the lower notes). With the aid of an 'octave' or 'register' key, the notes sound an octave higher as the fingering pattern repeats. These instruments are said to overblow at the octave. The clarinet differs, since it acts as a closed-pipe system. The low chalumeau register plays fundamentals, but the clarion (second) register plays the third harmonics, a perfect twelfth higher than the fundamentals. The clarinet is therefore said to overblow at the twelfth.  The first several notes of the altissimo (third) range, aided by the register key and venting with the first left-hand hole, play the fifth harmonics, a perfect twelfth plus a major sixth above the fundamentals. The fifth and seventh harmonics are also available, sounding a further sixth and fourth (a flat, diminished fifth) higher respectively; these are the notes of the altissimo register.

The lip position and pressure, shaping of the vocal tract, choice of reed and mouthpiece, amount of air pressure created, and evenness of the airflow account for most of the player's ability to control the tone of a clarinet. Their vocal tract will be shaped to resonate at frequencies associated with the tone being produced. Vibrato, a pulsating change of pitch, is rare in classical literature; however, certain performers, such as Richard Stoltzman, use vibrato in classical music. Special fingerings and lip-bending may be used to play microtonal intervals. There have also been efforts to create a quarter tone clarinet.

Construction

Materials
Clarinet bodies have been made from a variety of materials including wood, plastic, hard rubber or Ebonite, metal, and ivory. The vast majority of wooden clarinets are made from blackwood, grenadilla, or, more uncommonly, Honduran rosewood or cocobolo. Historically other woods, particularly boxwood and ebony, were used. Some student clarinets are made of plastic, such as ABS. One of the first such blends of plastic was Resonite, a term originally trademarked by Selmer. The Greenline model by Buffet Crampon is made from a composite of resin and the African blackwood powder left over from the manufacture of wooden clarinets.

Metal soprano clarinets were popular in the late 19th century, particularly for military use. Metal is still used for the bodies of some contra-alto and contrabass clarinets and the necks and bells of nearly all alto and larger clarinets.

Mouthpieces are generally made of hard rubber, although some inexpensive mouthpieces may be made of plastic. Other materials such as glass, wood, ivory, and metal have also been used. Ligatures are often made of metal and tightened using one or more adjustment screws; other materials include plastic, string, or fabric.

Reed
The clarinet uses a single reed made from the cane of Arundo donax. Reeds may also be manufactured from synthetic materials. The ligature fastens the reed to the mouthpiece. When air is blown through the opening between the reed and the mouthpiece facing, the reed vibrates and produces the clarinet's sound.

Most players buy manufactured reeds, although many make adjustments to these reeds, and some make their own reeds from cane "blanks". Reeds come in varying degrees of hardness, generally indicated on a scale from one (soft) through five (hard). This numbering system is not standardized—reeds with the same number often vary in hardness across manufacturers and models. Reed and mouthpiece characteristics work together to determine ease of playability and tonal characteristics.

Components

The reed is attached to the mouthpiece by the ligature, and the top half-inch or so of this assembly is held in the player's mouth. In the past, string was used to bind the reed to the mouthpiece. The formation of the mouth around the mouthpiece and reed is called the embouchure. The reed is on the underside of the mouthpiece, pressing against the player's lower lip, while the top teeth normally contact the top of the mouthpiece (some players roll the upper lip under the top teeth to form what is called a 'double-lip' embouchure). Adjustments in the strength and shape of the embouchure change the tone and intonation. Players sometimes relieve the pressure on the upper teeth and inner lower lip by attaching a pad to the top of the mouthpiece or putting temporary cushioning on the lower teeth.

The mouthpiece attaches to the barrel. Tuning can be adjusted by using barrels of varying lengths or by pulling out the barrel to increase the instrument's length. On basset horns and lower clarinets, there is a curved metal neck instead of a barrel.

The main body of most clarinets has an upper joint, whose mechanism is mostly operated by the left hand, and a lower joint, mostly operated by the right hand. Some clarinets have a one-piece body. The modern soprano clarinet has numerous tone holes—seven are covered with the fingertips and the rest are operated using a set of 17 keys. The most common system of keys was named the Boehm system by its designer Hyacinthe Klosé after flute designer Theobald Boehm, but it is not the same as the Boehm system used on flutes. The other main key system is the Oehler system, which is used mostly in Germany and Austria. The related Albert system is used by some jazz, klezmer, and eastern European folk musicians. The Albert and Oehler systems are both based on the early Mueller system.

The cluster of keys at the bottom of the upper joint (protruding slightly beyond the cork of the joint) are known as the trill keys and are operated by the right hand. The entire weight of the smaller clarinets is supported by the right thumb behind the lower joint on what is called the thumb rest. Larger clarinets are supported with a neck strap or a floor peg.

Below the main body is a flared end known as the bell. The bell does not amplify the sound but improves the uniformity of the instrument's tone for the lowest notes in each register. For the other notes, the sound is produced almost entirely at the tone holes, and the bell is irrelevant. On basset horns and larger clarinets, the bell curves up and forward and is usually made of metal.

History

The clarinet has its roots in early single-reed instruments used in Ancient Greece and Ancient Egypt. The modern clarinet developed from a Baroque instrument called the chalumeau. This instrument was similar to a recorder, but with a single-reed mouthpiece and a cylindrical bore. Lacking a register key, it was played mainly in its fundamental register, with a limited range of about one and a half octaves. It had eight finger holes, like a recorder, and a written pitch range from F3 to G4. At this time, contrary to modern practice, the reed was placed in contact with the upper lip.

Around the beginning of the 18th century the German instrument maker Johann Christoph Denner (or possibly his son Jacob Denner) equipped a chalumeau in the alto register with two keys, one of which enabled access to a higher register. This second register did not begin an octave above the first, as with other woodwind instruments, but started an octave and a perfect fifth higher than the first. A second key, at the top, extended the range of the first register to A4 and, together with the register key, to B4. Later, Denner lengthened the bell and provided it with a third key to extend the pitch range down to E3.

After Denner's innovations, other makers added keys to improve tuning and facilitate fingerings and the chalumeau fell into disuse. The clarinet of the Classical period, as used by Mozart, typically had five keys. Mozart suggested extending the clarinet downwards by four semitones to C, which resulted in the basset clarinet that was about  longer, made first by Theodor Lotz. In 1791 Mozart composed the Concerto for Clarinet and Orchestra in A major for this instrument, with passages ranging down to C3. By the time of Beethoven, the clarinet was a fixed member in the orchestra.

The number of keys was limited because their felt pads did not seal tightly. German clarinetist and master clarinet maker Iwan Müller remedied this by countersinking the tone holes for the keys and covering the pads with soft leather. These leather pads sealed the holes better than felt, making it possible to equip the instrument with considerably more keys. In 1812 Müller presented a clarinet with seven finger holes and thirteen keys, which he called "clarinet omnitonic" since it was capable of playing in all keys. It was no longer necessary to use differently tuned clarinets for a different keys. Müller is also considered the inventor of the metal ligature and the thumb rest. During this period the typical embouchure also changed, orienting the mouthpiece with the reed facing downward. This was first recommended in 1782 and became standard by the 1830s.

In the late 1830s, German flute maker Theobald Böhm invented a ring and axle key system for the flute. This key system was first used on the clarinet between 1839 and 1843 by French clarinetist Hyacinthe Klosé in collaboration with instrument maker Louis Auguste Buffet. Their design introduced needle springs for the axles, and the ring keys simplified some complicated fingering patterns. The inventors called this the Boehm clarinet, although Böhm was not involved in its development and the system differed from the one used on the flute. Other key systems have been developed, many built around modifications to the basic Boehm system, including the Full Boehm, Mazzeo, McIntyre, the Benade NX, and the Reform Boehm system, which combined Boehm-system keywork with a German mouthpiece and bore.

The Albert clarinet was developed by Eugène Albert in 1848. This model was based on the Müller clarinet with some changes to keywork, and was also known as the "simple system". It included a "spectacle key" patented by Adolphe Sax and rollers to improve little-finger movement. After 1861, a "patent C sharp" key developed by Joseph Tyler was added to other clarinet models. Improved versions of Albert clarinets were built in Belgium and France for export to the UK and the US.

Around 1860, clarinettist Carl Baermann and instrument maker Georg Ottensteiner developed the patented Baermann/Ottensteiner clarinet. This instrument had new connecting levers, allowing multiple fingering options to operate some of the pads. The Brahms clarinetist Richard Mühlfeld used this clarinet, and the American clarinet soloist Charles Neidich has used a Baermann-Ottensteiner instrument for playing compositions by Brahms.

In the early 20th century, the German clarinetist and clarinet maker  presented a clarinet using similar fingerings to the Baermann instrument, with significantly more toneholes than the Böhm model. The new clarinet was called the Oehler system clarinet or German clarinet, while the Böhm clarinet has since been called the French clarinet. The French clarinet differs from the German not only in fingering but also in sound. Richard Strauss noted that "French clarinets have a flat, nasal tone, while German ones approximate the singing voice". Among modern instruments the difference is smaller, although intonation differences persist. The use of Oehler clarinets has continued in German and Austrian orchestras.

Today the Boehm system is standard everywhere except in Germany and Austria, where the Oehler clarinet is still used. Some contemporary Dixieland players continue to use Albert system clarinets. The Reform Boehm system is also popular in the Netherlands.

Usage and repertoire

Use of multiple clarinets

The modern orchestral standard of using soprano clarinets in B and A has to do partly with the history of the instrument and partly with acoustics, aesthetics, and economics. Before about 1800, due to the lack of airtight pads, practical woodwinds could have only a few keys to control accidentals (notes outside their diatonic home scales). The low (chalumeau) register of the clarinet spans a twelfth (an octave plus a perfect fifth) before overblowing, so the clarinet needs keys/holes to produce all nineteen notes in this range. This involves more keywork than on instruments that "overblow" at the octave—oboes, flutes, bassoons, and saxophones need only twelve notes before overblowing. Since clarinets with few keys cannot play chromatically, they are limited to playing in closely related keys. For example, an eighteenth-century clarinet in C could play music in F, C, and G (and their relative minors) with good intonation, but with progressive difficulty and poorer intonation as the key moved away from this range. With the advent of airtight pads and improved key technology, more keys were added to woodwinds and the need for clarinets in multiple keys was reduced. The use of instruments in C, B, and A persisted, with each used as specified by the composer.

The lower-pitched clarinets sound "mellower" (less bright), and the C clarinet—the highest and brightest sounding of these three—fell out of favor as the other two could cover its range and their sound was considered better. While the clarinet in C began to fall out of general use around 1850, some composers continued to write C parts, e.g., Bizet's Symphony in C (1855), Tchaikovsky's Symphony No. 2 (1872), Smetana's overture to The Bartered Bride (1866) and Má Vlast (1874), Dvořák's Slavonic Dance Op. 46, No. 1 (1878), Brahms' Symphony No. 4 (1885), Mahler's Symphony No. 6 (1906), and Strauss' Der Rosenkavalier (1911).

While technical improvements and an equal-tempered scale reduced the need for two clarinets, the technical difficulty of playing in remote keys persisted, and the A has remained a standard orchestral instrument. By the late 19th century the orchestral clarinet repertoire contained so much music for clarinet in A that it has remained in use.

Classical music

The orchestra frequently includes two clarinetists, each usually equipped with a B and an A clarinet, and clarinet parts commonly alternate between the instruments. In the 20th century, Igor Stravinsky, Richard Strauss, and Gustav Mahler employed many different clarinets, including the E or D soprano clarinets, basset horn, bass clarinet, and/or contrabass clarinet. The practice of using different clarinets to achieve tonal variety was common in 20th-century classical music.

The E clarinet, B clarinet, alto clarinet, bass clarinet, and contra-alto/contrabass clarinet are commonly used in concert bands, which generally have multiple B clarinets; there are commonly three or even four B clarinet parts with two to three players per part.

The clarinet is widely used as a solo instrument. The clarinet evolved later than other orchestral woodwind instruments, leaving solo repertoire from the Classical period onward, but few works from the Baroque era. Many clarinet concertos and clarinet sonatas have been written to showcase the instrument, for example those by Mozart and Weber.

Many works of chamber music have been written for the clarinet. Common combinations are:
 Clarinet and piano
 Clarinet trio: clarinet, piano, and another instrument (for example, a string instrument)
 Clarinet quartet: three B clarinets and bass clarinet; two B clarinets, alto clarinet, and bass; and other possibilities such as the use of a basset horn, especially in European classical works
 Clarinet quintet: a clarinet plus a string quartet or, in more contemporary music, a configuration of five clarinets
 Wind quintet: flute, oboe, clarinet, bassoon, and horn.
Groups of clarinets playing together have become increasingly popular among clarinet enthusiasts in recent years. Common forms are:

 Clarinet choir: This ensemble contains many clarinets playing together, usually including several members of the clarinet family. The homogeneity of tone across the different members of the clarinet family produces an effect with some similarities to a human choir.
 Clarinet quartet: usually three B sopranos and one B bass, or two B, an E alto clarinet, and a B bass clarinet, or sometimes four B sopranos

Jazz

The clarinet was a central instrument in jazz, beginning with early jazz players in the 1910s. It remained a signature instrument of the genre through much of the big band era into the 1940s. American players Alphonse Picou, Larry Shields, Jimmie Noone, Johnny Dodds, and Sidney Bechet were all prominent early jazz clarinet players. Swing performers such as Benny Goodman and Artie Shaw rose to prominence in the late 1930s.

Beginning in the 1940s, the clarinet faded from its prominent position in jazz. By that time, an interest in Dixieland, a revival of traditional New Orleans jazz, had begun. Pete Fountain was one of the best known performers in this genre. The clarinet's place in the jazz ensemble was usurped by the saxophone, which projects a more powerful sound and uses a less complicated fingering system. The clarinet did not entirely disappear from jazz—prominent players since the 1950s include Stan Hasselgård, Jimmy Giuffre, Eric Dolphy (on bass clarinet), Perry Robinson, and John Carter. In the US, the prominent players on the instrument since the 1980s have included Eddie Daniels, Don Byron, Marty Ehrlich, Ken Peplowski, and others playing in both traditional and contemporary styles.

Other genres
The clarinet is uncommon, but not unheard of, in rock music. Jerry Martini played clarinet on Sly and the Family Stone's 1968 hit, "Dance to the Music". The Beatles included a trio of clarinets in "When I'm Sixty-Four" from their Sgt. Pepper's Lonely Hearts Club Band album. A clarinet is prominently featured in what a Billboard reviewer termed a "Benny Goodman-flavored clarinet solo" in "Breakfast in America", the title song from the Supertramp album of the same name.

Clarinets feature prominently in klezmer music, which employs a distinctive style of playing. The popular Brazilian music style of choro uses the clarinet, as does Albanian saze and Greek koumpaneia folk music, and Bulgarian wedding music. In Turkish folk music, the Albert system clarinet in G is often used, commonly called a "Turkish clarinet".

Clarinet family

See also
 List of clarinet concerti
 List of clarinetists
 List of clarinet makers
 Double clarinet
 International Clarinet Association

References

Citations

Cited sources

Further reading

External links

 The International Clarinet Association

 
Jazz instruments
Orchestral instruments